White Otter Castle is an elaborate 3-storey log house built on the shore of White Otter Lake, about  south of Ignace, Ontario, Canada, by James Alexander "Jimmy" McOuat.

The "Castle" is a sturdy log house which stands 3 storeys tall (29 feet), with a turret extending up an additional floor (41 feet).  The main part of the building measures 24 by 28 feet, while an attached kitchen area adds a further 14 by 20 feet to the floorplan.

McOuat built his "castle" single-handedly, beginning in 1903 when he was 51, and finally completing it in 1915.  He felled and cut all of the red pine logs himself, and hoisted the finished, dovetailed beams (some of them weighing as much as 1600 lbs) into place by means of simple block and tackle.

James Alexander McOuat was born in Chatham, Argenteuil County,  Lower Canada (Québec), on Jan 17, 1855. He was the youngest son of David McOuat and Christian McGibbon, both of whom were born in Scotland and emigrated to Lower Canada in the early part of the 19th century. 

As a young boy, Jimmy threw a turnip at an elderly neighbour who cursed at him and said "You'll amount to nothing and die in a shack."  Years later, in his forties and farming near Rainy River, he invested all that he had in a gold mine on the Upper Manitou.  He lost everything, including his land.  

McOuat turned to trapping to earn a living and found himself on White Otter Lake, living in a rough trapper's shack. He became obsessed with what the old man said to him. Visitors to the cabin who met McOuat often commented that he would say "What do you think of my home - you'd never call that a shack, would you?"

McOuat is assumed to have drowned while netting fish in 1918.  His body was discovered by forest rangers, tangled in his net, near a reed bed beside an island on the lake.  The Rangers had come looking for him after reports he hadn't been seen all winter.  He likely drowned in late fall of 1918 and was found the following spring. 

His grave is next to the Castle.

Sources
Barr, Elinor, White Otter Castle: The Legacy of Jimmy McOuat. Thunder Bay: Singing Shield Productions, 1984.
The Castle of White Otter Lake, DVD, originally a film by Peter G. Elliott, written by Elinor Barr, narrated by Gordon Pinsent, 1985.

External links 
  Bill Houston

Houses in Ontario
Buildings and structures in Kenora District